The 2018 Puerto Vallarta Open was a professional tennis tournament played on hard courts. It was the 1st edition of the tournament which was part of the 2018 ATP Challenger Tour. It took place in Puerto Vallarta, Mexico between 30 April and 5 May.

Singles main-draw entrants

Seeds

 1 Rankings are as of 23 April 2018.

Other entrants
The following players received wildcards into the singles main draw:
  Tigre Hank
  Gerardo López Villaseñor
  Manuel Sánchez
  Marcelo Sepúlveda

The following players received entry into the singles main draw using protected rankings:
  Nicolás Barrientos
  Alejandro Gómez

The following player received entry into the singles main draw as an alternate:
  Brydan Klein

The following players received entry from the qualifying draw:
  Viktor Durasovic
  Felipe Mantilla
  Luis David Martínez
  Evan Song

Champions

Singles
 
 Adrián Menéndez Maceiras def.  Danilo Petrović 1–6, 7–5, 6–3.

Doubles

 Ante Pavić /  Danilo Petrović def.  Benjamin Lock /  Fernando Romboli 6–7(2–7), 6–4, [10–5].

References

2018 ATP Challenger Tour